"Love Theme from Romeo and Juliet", also known as "A Time for Us", is an instrumental arranged by Henry Mancini (from Nino Rota's music written for Franco Zeffirelli's film of Romeo and Juliet, starring Leonard Whiting and Olivia Hussey).

History
The song was a number-one pop hit in the United States during the year 1969. It topped the Billboard Hot 100 singles chart on June 28, 1969, and remained there for two weeks; it was also his only Top Ten single on that chart.

Rearranged by Mancini, who played the piano part himself, the song started competing with rock and roll songs from the Beatles and the Rolling Stones on an Orlando, Florida radio station and spread from there. It faced stiff opposition from some radio stations for being too soft. Those stations changed their tune when the song became number one, ending the five-week run of "Get Back" by the Beatles as the top song.

This release topped the U.S. easy listening chart for eight weeks, where it was Mancini's sole number one on the chart.

The score was used for Lana Del Rey's song "Old Money" on her album Ultraviolence (2013).

Personnel
Henry Mancini – piano
Hal Blaine – drums

Lyrics
The song has at least three different sets of English lyrics.

The first English version is called "What Is a Youth?", featuring lyrics by Eugene Walter, and sung by Glen Weston. This version was used in the film and was released on the soundtrack album in 1968.

The second English version is called "A Time for Us", featuring lyrics by Larry Kusik and Eddie Snyder. This version has been recorded by Johnny Mathis, Shirley Bassey, Andy Williams, Stevie Wonder, and others.

The third English version is called "Old Money", featuring lyrics by  Elizabeth Woolridge Grant, Robert John Ellis Fitzsimmons, and Daniel Law Heath, and sung by Lana Del Rey on her third studio album, Ultraviolence (2013).

Two different sets of Italian lyrics have been written for the song.

The first Italian version is called "Un Giorno Per Noi" (A Day for Us), sung by Josh Groban, and is considered a direct translation of the Kusik and Snyder version of "A Time for Us".

The second Italian version is called "Ai Giochi Addio" (Goodbye to the Games), featuring lyrics by Elsa Morante, and has been performed by prominent opera singers, such as Luciano Pavarotti and Natasha Marsh.

Certifications

See also
 Romeo and Juliet (1968 film soundtrack)

References

External links

1969 singles
Billboard Hot 100 number-one singles
Cashbox number-one singles
Compositions by Henry Mancini
1960s instrumentals
Love themes
Music based on works by William Shakespeare
RCA Victor singles